The Heavy Vehicles Factory (HVF) located at Avadi in Chennai in the Indian state of Tamil Nadu is an armoured vehicle and battle tank manufacturing factory of Armoured Vehicles Nigam Limited.

HVF was set up in 1961 by the Ordnance Factory Board, Government of India to manufacture heavy battlefield equipment, including Vijayantas, Kartik BLT, M-46 Catapult and T-72 Ajeya tanks and was later made part of Armoured Vehicles Nigam Limited in 2021 and part of the corporatisation of Ordnance Factory Board.

Currently, HVF manufactures India's Arjun MBT, BLT T-72, T-72 for TRAWL and the T-90 Bhishmas. Apart from OE manufacturing HVF also has the facility of overhauling all the tanks manufactured at HVF.The Engine Factory of HVF functions separately from HVF.

Solar plant
The factory has a 16 mega watt (MW) solar power plant, spread over 80 acres of land, commissioned in 2018, which is the largest solar power plant in the city. It was installed by Bharat Electronics Limited (BEL) at a cost of 1,050 million. A 110 kilo volt (KV) substation had been constructed to distribute the power generated from the plant. The plant helps reduce carbon dioxide emissions to the extent of 26,000 tonnes per annum, saving 45 million annually to the HVF and Engine Factory (EFA).

Gallery

References

Defence companies of India
Economy of Chennai
Manufacturing companies based in Chennai
1961 establishments in Madras State
Manufacturing companies established in 1961